The Trebbia (stressed Trèbbia) is a river predominantly of Liguria and Emilia Romagna in northern Italy. It is one of the four main right-bank tributaries of the river Po, the other three being the Tanaro, the Secchia and the Panaro.

Along its eastern banks in 218 BC was fought one of the battles of the Second Punic War: the Battle of Trebbia, where Hannibal defeated a Roman consular army.

The  drainage basin is divided among Emilia Romagna, Liguria, and Lombardy, . Its principal tributaries are the torrents Aveto and Perino (from the right) and the torrent Boreca (from the left).

Geography
The source of the river, the Trebbia river spring, is in the Ligurian Apennines on the south slopes of Monte Prelà, to the south of Monte Antola in the comune of Torriglia, Province of Genoa.

Across a small ridge to the west, on which sits Torriglia, and slightly further downslope is the source of the Scrivia river. Over a ridge to the northeast is the Brugneto reservoir, water supply for Genoa. The reservoir was created in 1959 by damming Brugneto stream, which formerly joined its waters to the Trebbia, but now only does so when the reservoir is full. From its peak on a clear day can be seen Genoa, Corsica, the Tuscan Archipelago and the Alps.

From its source the river flows towards north-east for  until it reaches the Po just to the west of Piacenza. The Alta Val Trebbia ("High Trebbia Valley") includes the valley down to Bobbio. It straddles eight comuni of the Province of Genoa: Torriglia, Rondanina, Propata, Fascia, Montebruno, Rovegno, Fontanigorda and Gorreto. Each of these contains numerous hamlets, some on the river, most on the slopes. Gorreto is on the Ligurian side of the border with Piacenza province.

Past Gorreto the Trebbia flows under a few mountain villages arriving at the next town, Ottone. Below Ottone Val Boreca enters from the left opposite the frazione of Losso. The Boreca is a mountain brook falling from the heights of the "four provinces" region generally too small to be shown on maps but visible in satellite photographs. Just below Zerba (from which it is accessed) its waters are impounded by a dam diverting them through the turbines of a hydroelectric power station.

The border with the Province of Pavia in southernmost Lombardy follows the Trebbia for about  where it bends around Ponte Organasco, so that some of the river and bottom lands are in Lombardy. Further downstream the valley opens to accommodate Corte Brugnatella and then closes to form steep sides again. Receiving the Torrente Carlone from the left it enters Bobbio on the left bank. Here the high valley ends and the valley becomes the Val Trebbia.

The river goes on under a good many small communities located up on the flanks of the hills before reaching the next good-sized town on it, Travo, and then Rivergaro. Here the val ends. It widens and merges with the Pianura Padana, "plain of the Po", beyond Rivergaro and a few miles later encounters the suburban communities on the west side of Piacenza before entering the Po. Geologically the course of the lower Trebbia and that of the Po is unstable except where stabilized by man.

Nearly the whole course of the river is paralleled by the Strada statale della Val Trebbia, highway SS45, running between Piacenza and Genoa. It encounters the river at Rivergaro and winds with it through the mountains, breaking away just below the source to bend southwest over the ridges to Genoa.

Ecology

Flora

The shrubbery includes the following species: Juniperus communis, Rubus fruticosus, Rubus idaeus, Polygala chamaebuxus, Daphne mezereum, Vaccinium myrtillus, Cornus mas, Euonymus europaea, Cytisus sessilifolius, Erica arborea, Ruscus aculeatus, Clematis vitalba, Lonicera caprifolium, Crataegus oxyacantha, Rosa canina, Spartium junceum.

The ferns are Polypodium volgare, Asplenium ruta-muraria, Dryopteris filix-mas, Pteridium aquilinum, Notholaena marantae.

Fauna
The Val Trebbia is within the endemic range of Moltoni's warbler, a subspecies of Sylvia cantillans better known in the western Mediterranean islands. The birds forage for insects in mixed shrubland of varying heights and both broad-leaved and coniferous composition.

The other birds include Buteo buteo, Falco tinnunculus, Accipiter nisus, Pernis apivorus, Cinclus cinclus, Charadrius dubius, Motacilla alba, Motacilla flava, Alcedo atthis, Alectoris rufa and Picus viridis.

Geologic history
The northern Apennines are a belt of northeast-southwest mountains on the coast of northwest Italy folded by transverse thrusting from sedimentary rock.

For much of their lengths, these heavily braided streams run through montane terrain that is minimally developed, is known for its wildlife, and remains in a pristine state. The sediment eroded from the mountains is deposited in alluvial fans and terraces in the Po valley, which is heavily populated and in ancient times flooded regularly. Diking has prevented much of the flooding but now due to confinement of deposition within the stream beds significant lengths of stream run entirely above ground, in places as high as the rooftops. This is a development of the previous thousand years.

The native rock differs between the two banks. On the left is mainly sedimentary rock, the Monte Antola limestone, which is actually a marlstone. On the right is both sedimentary and metamorphic rock: ophiolite, serpentinite, basalt, jasper.

It consists of loess deposited in layers during periods of glacial maxima beginning about 400000 years ago in the Middle Pleistocene. The loess initially accumulated on gravelled terraces deriving from native rock.

Cultural history
Judging from the archaeological evidence, the Trebbia valley has been continuously occupied since the end of the Acheulian in the Paleolithic, about 150000 years ago. In the Mesolithic various summer camps for high-altitude hunting were located in the valley. Neolithic cultures were at first diverse (4500 BC). Later in the Neolithic, at about 4000 BC, the Square-mouthed pottery culture began to prevail; at about 3000 BC, the Chassey-Lagozza culture of the Chalcolithic. The Bronze Age population resided in settlements located at positions with natural defenses. Etruscan elements began in the Iron Age, about the 5th century BC. Celtic artifacts immediately preceded the Roman presence.

Along its eastern banks in 218 BC was fought one of the battles of the Second Punic War: the Battle of Trebbia, where Hannibal defeated a Roman consular army.

The name of the river is first known from Polybius, who wrote in the middle Roman Republic, but used materials dating to earlier. Which people first assigned it and during which period remains unclear. Without knowing the probable language the few etymologies are highly speculative.

Gallery

Notes

References

External links
 Kayak pictures of Trebbia river

 
 
 

Rivers of Italy
Rivers of the Province of Genoa
Rivers of the Province of Piacenza
Rivers of the Province of Pavia
Rivers of the Apennines